is a Japanese cross-country skier. She competed in two events at the 1968 Winter Olympics.

References

External links
 

1946 births
Living people
Japanese female cross-country skiers
Olympic cross-country skiers of Japan
Cross-country skiers at the 1968 Winter Olympics
Sportspeople from Hokkaido